Arie Maliniak is a former Israeli basketball player and coach who now works as a journalist, radio broadcaster, television presenter and as a life coach.

Honors

As a Player
National Championships (1): 1968–69
State Cup (1): 1968–69

References

1949 births
Living people
Hapoel Tel Aviv B.C. players
Israeli basketball coaches
Israeli journalists
Israeli television personalities
Sportspeople from Ramat Gan
Israeli twins
Twin sportspeople
Life coaches